The Cliveden Set was a 1930s upper-class group of prominent people, who were politically influential before the Second World War in the United Kingdom. They were in the circle of Nancy Astor, Viscountess Astor, the first female Member of Parliament to take her seat. The name comes from Cliveden, a stately home in Buckinghamshire that was Astor's country residence. 

The "Cliveden Set" tag was coined by Claud Cockburn in his journalism for the communist newspaper The Week. His notion of an upper class pro-German conspiracy was widely  accepted by opponents of Appeasement in the late 1930s. It was long accepted that the  aristocratic Germanophile social network supported friendly relations with Nazi Germany and helped create the 1930s policy of appeasement. John L. Spivak, writing in 1939, devoted a chapter to the Cliveden Set. 

After the Second World War ended, the discovery of the Nazis'  Black Book in September 1945 showed that all the group's members were to be arrested as soon as Britain had been invaded by the  Axis. Lady Astor remarked, "It is the complete answer to the terrible lie that the so-called 'Cliveden Set' was pro-Fascist".  

New research shows that the Astors invited a very wide range of guests, including socialists, communists and enemies of appeasement. Scholars no longer claim there was any Cliveden conspiracy. Historian Andrew Roberts says: "The myth of Cliveden being a nest of appeasers, let alone pro-Nazis, is exploded."  Norman Rose's 2000 account of the group rejects the conspiracy theory of a pro-Nazi cabal. Carroll Quigley argues against the "mistaken idea" that the Cliveden group was pro-German: "They were neither anti-German in 1910 nor Pro-German in 1938, but pro-Empire all the time." .

 Christopher Sykes, in a sympathetic 1972 biography of Nancy Astor, argued that the entire story about the Cliveden Set had been an ideologically motivated fabrication by Cockburn that came to be generally accepted by a public, which was looking for scapegoats for the British prewar appeasement of Adolf Hitler. Some academic arguments have stated that Cockburn's account may have not have been entirely accurate, but that his main allegations cannot be easily dismissed.

Alleged conspirators
 Nancy Astor, Viscountess Astor, politician and socialite
 Geoffrey Dawson, editor of the London Times newspaper
 Philip Kerr (Lord Lothian), author and politician
 Edward Wood (Lord Halifax), politician
 William Montagu, 9th Duke of Manchester, politician
 Robert Brand

Fictional portrayals

Hogan's Heroes
In the fourth and fifth episodes of season six of the 1960s sitcom Hogan's Heroes, the two-part episode "Lady Chitterly's Lover" involves a plot to negotiate Britain's surrender from a fictitious member of the Cliveden Set, Sir Charles Chitterly. While this is based on no direct historical counterpart, it does incorporate - among other events - elements of the visit to Nazi Germany in the late 1930s of the former British King Edward VIII after he had abdicated the throne in 1936 and settled into exile in France.

The Remains Of The Day
Lord Darlington, the fictional secondary protagonist in Nobel Prize-winning British author Sir Kazuo Ishiguro's 1989 novel The Remains Of The Day is based on an amalgamation of several of the more prominent members of the Cliveden Set, some of whom are listed above. The novel was turned into the 1993 film of the same name which was nominated for eight Academy Awards and six BAFTA Awards, including a BAFTA win for Sir Anthony Hopkins in the Best Actor category. The social gatherings that are held at the fictional Darlington Hall in the film between Nazis and British subjects seeking peace and being manipulated by the Nazi representatives are based on several dinner parties and other social gatherings that were held by the Cliveden Set. It was later revealed that the Nazis had, as a part of Operation Sea Lion, an arrest list that included almost all of the members of the Cliveden Set.<ref>Nancy, the Life of Lady Astor, Christopher Sykes (London: Collins, 1972)</ref>

See also
 Anglo-German Fellowship
 Guilty Men (1940)
 The Black Book (list)

References

Further reading

 Norman Rose The Cliveden Set: Portrait of an Exclusive Fraternity (London: Jonathan Cape, 2000)
 Christopher Sykes Nancy, the Life of Lady Astor(London: Collins, 1972)
"A Reevaluation of Cockburn's Cliveden Set", online academic essay, John Taylor, San Francisco State University (1999)
 Margaret George.  The Hollow Men'', (London: Frewin, 1965)
 Ari Cushner. "Fighting Fire with Propaganda: Claud Cockburn's The Week and the Anti-Nazi Intrigue that Produced the ‘Cliveden Set,’ 1932-1939,"  San Francisco State University (2007)

20th century in the United Kingdom
Conspiracy theories in the United Kingdom